Couto Magalhães is a municipality located in the Brazilian state of Tocantins. Its population was 5,639 (2020) and its area is 1,586 km² (612.4 mi²), a density of 3.07 people/km² (8 people/mi²). It is located 150 m (492.1 ft) above sea level. The demonym is Coutense.

References

Municipalities in Tocantins